USS LSM-115 was a LSM-1-class Landing Ship Medium of the United States Navy that saw active service in World War II in the Pacific Theater.

Built by the Brown Ship Building Co., Houston, Texas, the ship was commissioned on 2 December 1944.

Service history
During World War II LSM-115 was assigned to service in China. Decommissioned on 19 June 1946, she was later sold to Charles Weaver & Co. of Detroit, MI. on 29 December 1946 and converted to a barge.

Awards, citations and campaign ribbons
 China Service Medal (extended)
 American Campaign Medal
 Asiatic-Pacific Campaign Medal
 World War II Victory Medal 
 National Defense Service Medal

References
 

World War II amphibious warfare vessels of the United States
LSM-1-class landing ships medium
1944 ships